Placodiscus paniculatus is a species of plant in the family Sapindaceae. It is endemic to the Democratic Republic of the Congo.

References

Flora of the Democratic Republic of the Congo
paniculatus
Vulnerable plants
Taxonomy articles created by Polbot